Federico Solmi (born April 1973) is a visual artist based in Brooklyn, New York.

About 
Federico Solmi's work utilizes bright colors and a satirical aesthetic to portray a dystopian vision of our present-day society. His exhibitions often feature articulate installations composed of a variety of media including video, painting, drawing, and sculpture.

In 2009, Solmi was awarded by the Guggenheim Foundation of New York with the John Simon Guggenheim Memorial Fellowship in the category of Video & Audio. From 2016 to 2019, Solmi was a visiting professor at the Yale University School of Art and Yale School of Drama in New Haven, Connecticut.

Exhibitions 
Federico Solmi's work was included in the exhibition The Outwin 2019: American Portraiture Today, at the Smithsonian National Portrait Gallery, Washington DC. For the month of July 2019 his video installation “American Circus” was featured in Times Square New York for the Midnight moment series.

Solmi's works have been exhibited in several international biennials including: Open Spaces: A Kansas City Arts Experience (2018), the Beijing Media Art Biennale (2016), Frankfurt B3 Biennial of the Moving image (2017-2015), the First Shenzhen Animation Biennial in China (2013), the 54th Venice Biennial (2011), and the SITE Santa Fe Biennial in New Mexico (2010). Solmi' s work has been featured in solo museum exhibitions including Rowan University Art Gallery, Glassboro, New Jersey,  Tarble Art Center, Charleston Illinois, Rochester Contemporary Art Center, Rochester, New York,  Museo de Arte Contemporaneo del Zulia Maracaibo, Venezuela, the Haifa Museum of Art, Israel, the Centro Cultural Matucana 100, Santiago, Chile, The Italian Cultural institute of Madrid, Spain. Solmi' s videos have also been screened in festivals around the world, such as: Kassel Documentary Film and Video Festival, Tina B (Prague), Les Rencontres Internationales (Paris, Madrid, Berlin), The London International Animation Festival, Loop Barcelona, and more. He has given lectures on his work at universities and art schools in the United States and Europe.

Collections 
 
Solmi’s work is part of many notable collections including The Phillips Collection, Washington D.C.; Block Museum of Art at Northwestern University, Evanston, IL; Tarble Art Center, Charleston, IL; 21C Museum Hotels, Knoxville, TN; Thoma Foundation, Chicago, IL / Santa Fe, NM; OCAT, Oct Contemporary Art Terminal, Shanghai, China; Collezione Farnesina Experimenta, Rome, Italy; Dr. Arturo and Liza Mosquera Collection, Miami, FL; and Collezione Marchina, Milan, Italy.

Awards 

Guggenheim Foundation of New York with the John Simon Guggenheim Memorial Fellowship in the category of Video & Audio

Ben Award – Frankfurt B3 Biennal Of The Moving Image – Frankfurt Germany, 2015

Articles

2020
Darren Jones – Review of the exhibition “The Bacchanalian Ones”, Rowan University Art Gallery, Glassboro, New Jersey – Critics’ Picks, ARTFORUM
Eleanor Heartney – Federico’s Solmi March of Folly – Essay for the Catalog of the exhibition “The Bacchanalian Ones”, Rowan University Art Gallery, Glassboro, New Jersey
Mark Bloch – Review of the exhibition Art and Politics, Elga Wimmer Gallery, NY – Whitehot Magazine, December
Salvatore Russo – The Great Satirical Orgy Art – Interview with Federico Solmi – Art International Magazine

2019
Jamie Martinez – Interview with Artist Federico Solmi – ArteFuse, June
Maximilíano Durón & Katherine McMahon – Scenes from the 2019 Armory Show – Artnews, March 6
Zachary Small – Women and Minority Artists Flourish Amid Elite Indulgence at the 2019 Armory Show– Hyperallergic, March 7
Andy Smith – The Video Paintings of Federico Solmi – Hifructose, March 17

References

Publications
ARTBOOK, 2010
ARTFORUM, 2015
artnet Review
TTWISI, 2015

External links

Federico Solmi
Postmasters Gallery, New York
Conner Smith Gallery, Washington, D.C.
Luis De Jesus Los Angeles
ADN Galeria
John Simon Guggenheim Memorial Foundation

American digital artists
1973 births
Living people
Italian contemporary artists